Mr. Patman (also known as Crossover) is a 1980 Canadian film directed by John Guillermin and starring James Coburn.

Synopsis
A nurse working the night shift in a psycho ward begins to lose his grip on reality.

Cast

Production
The film was shot from 3 December 1979 to 6 February 1980, on a budget of $6,900,000, with $500,000 coming from the Canadian Film Development Corporation. The film was based on a script by Thomas Hedley, later famous for writing Flashdance.

In May 1977 James Coburn was attached to the project with John Huston as director.

The film was shot in Vancouver. It was part of the boom in Canadian production due to tax concessions. An article later called 1980 " a year of national horror and shame" for the Canandian film industry, other efforts including Middle Aged Crazy and Circle for Two.

It was one of five films Coburn made over an 18-month period. "Something happened between the first script and the final re-write," he says of Patman. "In being made clearer, the film lost a lot of its charm and character. But the idea of a guy who works in a psychiatric ward, ultimately choosing to live in the madness there rather than the madness in the outside world, really appealed to me."

Kate Nelligan was Canadian, though based in New York where she had achieved great stage success. She agreed to return home to make the movie and help the film be classified as Canadian. Nelligan later called the movie a nightmare, saying in 1983 that "The Canadian film industry is a joke, and we Canadians should be ashamed of it. We passed a silly law to keep out American film professionals, from whom we might have learned something, and to assure that every incompetent film person in Canada could have a job. What we got were horribly incompetent people in top jobs, drunk most of the time, who went to Hollywood and got completely taken in by every agent in town, and in turn screwed every dentist in Canada out of $5,000 in tax-shelter investments. The boom seems to be over now. It was such a monstrous waste of time and money. I can say all that stuff, of course, because I'm Canadian."

Release
The film was released in Paris on 22 April 1981, but never received a theatrical release in Canada and was instead aired by the Canadian Broadcasting Corporation on 5 November.

The film was screened at the 1980 Toronto Film Festival. Reviewing it at the festival the Globe and Mail called the film "an honorable failure, honorable because its ambitions are lofty, and a failure because the ambitions are not tied to anything cinematically coherent - if Mr. Patman were literature, it would be a haiku unconscionably puffed into a short story. As a movie, it's a fragile featurette turned into an attenuated feature. Certainly it's good to want to say something, as Mr. Patman clearly does; it's even better to have something to say."

Maclean's said "just when Mr. Patman threatens to turn too heartwarming, it holds back and we respond to it without that put-upon feeling that we’re being coaxed into caring. It’s a thin line to tread but the director, John Guillermin... keeps a tight grip on the material, and the material has been shrewdly arranged, motifs and all, to tear your heart out."

An article in the Toronto Star from 2001 said "This notable dud was a product of Canada's notorious tax-shelter era when movies were for business write-offs rather than any creative imperative. Shot in Vancouver, it never lets the audience know where we are. A feeble echo of One Flew Over The Cuckoo's Nest, the movie had a British director (John Guillermin) and an American star (James Coburn). The screenwriter took his name off it after a dispute with producer Bill Marshall (one of the festival's founders). The movie had a gala slot at the 1980 festival, followed by a quick burial."

Filmink later called it "a really terrible movie, dull and lacking in atmosphere, the first bad picture Guillermin made in over a decade."

References

Works cited

External links

Mr Patman at BFI
Mr Patman at TCMDB
Mr Patman at Letterbox DVD

Films directed by John Guillermin
1980 films
English-language Canadian films
Films shot in Vancouver
Canadian thriller drama films
1980s English-language films
1980s Canadian films